Jaskaran Singh (born 4 September 1989) is an Indian first-class cricketer who plays for Chandigarh.

References

External links
 

1989 births
Living people
Indian cricketers
Punjab, India cricketers
Deccan Chargers cricketers
Sportspeople from Mohali
Cricketers from Punjab, India